Fredrikshalds Turnforening is a Norwegian gymnastics club from Halden, founded on 27 August 1879.

Four Olympic gymnasts have represented the club: gold medalist in 1906 Andreas Hagelund, silver and bronze medalist in 1908 and 1912 Paul Pedersen, silver medalist in 1908 Harald Hansen, and gold medalist in 1912 Frithjof Sælen.

References

 Official site 

Sport in Viken
Sport in Halden
Sports clubs established in 1879
1879 establishments in Norway
Gymnastics clubs in Norway